David D. Doniger & Company was a manufacturer of branded sportswear in the United States founded in 1921. It was the largest such US company in the mid-twentieth century, with sales of $50,000,000 in 7,000 outlets in 1956. Its home office was located at 666 Fifth Avenue (Manhattan).

Formerly a prominent exporter, tariff barriers and dollar shortages reduced its overseas markets.

McGregor sportswear
David D. Doniger imported his first line of clothes from Scotland and selected the McGregor label to go with it. In 1956 it licensed companies in eight foreign countries to produce sportswear using its McGregor label.

The firm changed its name to McGregor-Doniger. William and Harry E. Doniger (March 13, 1904 – January 3, 1961), the sons of David D. Doniger, succeeded their father as heads of McGregor-Doniger. Harry E. Doniger was credited with making colorful men's sportswear popular. In 1955 he was chosen Man of the Year for the Men's Wear industry.

McGregor-Doniger was purchased by Rapid-American in 1977.

References

Clothing companies established in 1921
1921 establishments in New York (state)
Manufacturing companies disestablished in 1977
1977 disestablishments in New York (state)
1977 mergers and acquisitions
American companies disestablished in 1977
Defunct manufacturing companies based in New York City